

Mulachara (Fundamental Conduct) is a Jain text composed by Acharya Vattakera of the Digambara tradition, around 150 CE. Mulachara discusses anagara-dharma – the conduct of a Digambara monk. It is also called Digambara Acharanga.

The text is written in a dialect that is distinct but shares characteristics with Ardhamagadhi. Its dialect has been called Digambara Sauraseni (or Jain Sauraseni) and proposed to reflect the language of ancient Mathura region by Indian scholars. Many characteristics of the Mulachara manuscript, as found in Karnataka, share elements of monastic conduct found in Svetambara scriptures. Some of the verses of Mulaccara are almost same as those found in Svetambara's Dasavaikalika. This suggests the existence of an ancient shared textual tradition between Digambaras and Svetambaras, one that likely split and differentiated later.

Vasunandin wrote a Sanskrit commentary on the Mulacara, and it is titled Acaravrtti.

See also 
 List of Jain texts

References

Bibliography

External links
 Hindi translation of Mūlacāra (Digital Library of India)

Jain texts